The open-mid central unrounded vowel, or low-mid central unrounded vowel, is a type of vowel sound, used in some spoken languages. The IPA symbol is not the digit  or the Cyrillic small letter Ze (з). The symbol is instead a reversed Latinized variant of the lowercase epsilon, ɛ. The value was specified only in 1993; until then, it had been transcribed .

The  letter may be used with a raising diacritic , to denote the mid central unrounded vowel. It may also be used with a lowering diacritic , to denote the near-open central unrounded vowel.

Conversely, the symbol for the mid central vowel may be used with a lowering diacritic  to denote the open-mid central unrounded vowel, although that is more accurately written with an additional unrounding diacritic  to explicitly denote the lack of rounding (the canonical value of IPA  is undefined for rounding).

Features

Occurrence

See also 

 R-colored vowel, a related phoneme in rhotic dialects of English

Notes

References

External links
 

Open-mid vowels
Central vowels
Unrounded vowels